Sarkar Ki Upalabdhiya is a 
newspaper published in Hindi, Urdu, English, and Sanskrit from Lucknow, Barabanki, Faizabad & Shravasti. It was started in 1993.

References

Daily newspapers published in India
Newspapers established in 1993
Companies based in Lucknow
1993 establishments in Uttar Pradesh
Newspapers published in Uttar Pradesh